Mönkhkhairkhan is a sum (district) of Khovd Province in western Mongolia. It is named after Mount Mönkhkhairkhan. The sum is 155 km away from the city of Khovd.

References 

Districts of Khovd Province